Na Bon is a district (amphoe) of Nakhon Si Thammarat province, southern Thailand.

Geography
Neighboring districts are (from the north clockwise): Chawang, Chang Klang, Thung Song, and Thung Yai.

Namtok Yong National Park is at the boundary to Thung Song District, protecting forested hills of the Nakhon Si Thammarat Range and includes several waterfalls.

History
On 9 June 1975 the two tambons, Na Bon and Thung Song, were split from Thung Song district to form the new minor district (king amphoe) Na Bon. On 13 July 1981 it was upgraded to a full district.

Symbols
The slogan of the district is "Khlong Chang waterfall, good breed of rubber, fertile land, join pit krit festival".

Administration
The district is divided into three sub-districts (tambons), which are further subdivided into 34 villages (mubans). Na Bon is a township (thesaban tambon) which covers parts of tambon Na Bon. There are a further three tambon administrative organizations (TAO).

References

External links
amphoe.com
https://web.archive.org/web/20170611200442/http://www.naboncity.go.th/ Website of Na Bon township (Thai)

Districts of Nakhon Si Thammarat province